Streptomyces viridiviolaceus is a bacterium species from the genus of Streptomyces.

See also 
 List of Streptomyces species

References

Further reading

External links
Type strain of Streptomyces viridiviolaceus at BacDive – the Bacterial Diversity Metadatabase	

viridiviolaceus
Bacteria described in 1958